was a Japanese samurai of the Edo period, who served as a lesser official in the Tokugawa shogunate. Kajikawa served on guard duty in Edo Castle.

Upon inheriting family headship, he became hatamoto (the direct vassal of a shōgun) and his annual stipend was 700 koku.

In 1701, he witnessed Asano Naganori injuring Kira Yoshinaka, and he arrested Asano. The action was evaluated and his annual salary was raised to 1200 koku.

His grave is at Kanryūzan Tentokuin (乾竜山天徳院), in Nakano, Tokyo.

See also 
Forty-seven rōnin

References

External links
Original text of Kajikawa Diary at Wikisource (in Japanese)

Samurai
Hatamoto
1647 births
1722 deaths